Central Heating is the second studio album by funk-disco band Heatwave, released in 1977 - 1978 on the GTO label in the UK and on the Epic label in the US. It was produced by Barry Blue.

It was the last Heatwave album to feature bassist Mario Mantese and guitarist Eric Johns, as well as the first to feature new member Roy Carter on guitar. The album was also the final performance of Rod Temperton as an official member of Heatwave, although he would continue to write songs for the band after his departure until 1982.

The song "Star of a Story" appeared on George Benson's album Give Me the Night, a song written by Temperton, which was produced by Quincy Jones.

The album was remastered and reissued with bonus tracks in 2015 by Big Break Records.

Track listing

Personnel
Heatwave
Johnnie Wilder Jr. - lead, backing, and choir vocals, congas
Keith Wilder - lead vocals
Rod Temperton - Fender Rhodes piano, clavinet, synthesizers, acoustic piano, organ 
Mario Mantese - bass guitar
Eric Johns - electric lead and rhythm guitars, Spanish Guitar
Ernest "Bilbo" Berger - drums, timbales
Roy Carter - rhythm and bass guitar, Fender Rhodes piano, acoustic piano 
with:
Frank Ricotti, Tristan Fry - percussion
Chris Payne - trombone solo on "Happiness Togetherness" 
Ron Mathieson - acoustic bass on "Leaving for a Dream"
Pat Halling - string leader
Technical
James Guthrie, Geoff Calver - engineer

Charts

Singles

References

External links

1977 albums
1978 albums
Heatwave (band) albums
GTO Records albums
Epic Records albums
Albums recorded at Morgan Sound Studios